Themistocles, the Lover of His Country is a 1729 tragedy by the Irish writer Samuel Madden. It is based on the life of the Ancient Greek general Themistocles.

The original Lincoln's Inn Fields cast included James Quin as Themistocles, Thomas Walker as Xerses, Thomas Chapman as Artaban, William Milward as Mardonius, Lacy Ryan as Aristides, John Ogden as Demaratus, Anne Berriman as Artemisia and Elizabeth Buchanan as Nesiptolema.

References

Bibliography
 Burling, William J. A Checklist of New Plays and Entertainments on the London Stage, 1700-1737. Fairleigh Dickinson Univ Press, 1992.
 Nicoll, Allardyce. A History of Early Eighteenth Century Drama: 1700-1750. CUP Archive, 1927.

1729 plays
British plays
Irish plays
Tragedy plays
West End plays